The Elder Avenue station is a local station on the IRT Pelham Line of the New York City Subway. Served by the 6 train at all times, it is located at the intersection of Elder Avenue and Westchester Avenue in the Soundview neighborhood of the Bronx.

History 
Elder Avenue station opened on May 30, 1920, as the Pelham Line was extended to East 177th Street from Hunts Point Avenue. The construction of the Pelham Line was part of the Dual Contracts, signed on March 19, 1913, and also known as the Dual Subway System. The Pelham Line was built as a branch of the Lexington Avenue Line running northeast via 138th Street, Southern Boulevard and Westchester Avenue. Initially, the extension was served by a shuttle service operating with elevated cars. Passengers transferred to the shuttle at Hunts Point Avenue.

Station layout

This elevated station has three tracks and two side platforms. The center track is used by the weekday peak direction <6> express service. Both platforms have beige windscreens and red canopies with green frames and support columns at the center and black waist-high steel fences at either ends. The station name plates are in the standard black with white lettering that covered up the original IRT style mosaic signs.

Exits
The station's only entrance/exit is an elevated station house beneath the tracks. Inside the turnstile bank, there are two staircases to each platform at the center and a waiting area that allows a free transfer between directions. Outside fare control, there is a token booth and two staircases going down to the southwest and northeast corner of Elder and Westchester Avenues.

References

External links 

 
 Station Reporter – 6 train
 The Subway Nut – Elder Avenue Pictures
 Elder Avenue entrance from Google Maps Street View
 Platforms from Google Maps Street View

IRT Pelham Line stations
New York City Subway stations in the Bronx
Railway stations in the United States opened in 1920
Soundview, Bronx